The Nazis Strike is the second film of Frank Capra's Why We Fight propaganda film series. It introduces Germany as a nation whose aggressive ambitions began in 1863 with Otto von Bismarck and the Nazis as its latest incarnation.

Heartland Theory

Hitler's plan for world domination is described in terms of Halford Mackinder's Heartland Theory, which starts about three minutes into the film:

Fifth column activity
The next focus of the film is the "softening-up" of the Western democracies by using fascist organizations such as the Belgian Rexists, the French Cross of Fire, the Sudeten German National Socialist Party of Konrad Henlein, the British Union of Fascists, and the German American Bund. Meanwhile, in Germany, the Nazis are beginning an enormous process of rearmament.

Germany then begins its territorial expansion with the first target being Austria, Hitler's "full-scale invasion test." He then uses his Sudeten "stooges" under Henlein to "soften up" Czechoslovakia and to annex the Sudetenland with the help of a Britain and France, which are desperate to avoid war. Hitler's use of the concept of self-determination as a justification for these annexations is ridiculed by reference to prominent German Americans thoroughly loyal to the Allied cause, such as Admiral Chester Nimitz, Henry J. Kaiser, Wendell Willkie and Senator Robert Wagner.

Invasion of Poland 
The film concludes with the Invasion of Poland, which is depicted with many inaccuracies.

The extreme disparity between the two sides is emphasized. The Germans have 5,000 modern tanks against Poland's 600 obsolete models, and the Luftwaffe has 6,000 modern monoplanes against less than 1,000 aircraft of the Polish Air Force, many of which are outdated biplanes. Animation is also used that graphically shows how Polish army units were encircled and destroyed. The film suggests most of the Polish Air Force to be destroyed on the ground and the Polish Army to rely heavily on mounted cavalry (see Tuchola Forest myth)

That suggests that its makers learned the details of the Polish campaign largely from Nazi propaganda in which both false claims were often made. The stubborn resistance of Polish forces in the Hel Peninsula is recognized, as are the widespread Nazi atrocities after the Polish defeat.

Overall, the movie gives the false impression that Polish Army to be ineffective and even pathetic and to do no damage to the Germans. The film also alleged widespread collaboration with the invading Germans but does not specify from whom.

The Germans are forced to stop at the Bug River, where they meet the advancing Red Army. The film misrepresents the German-Soviet Pact by claiming that the pact was signed only after the West had turned down Soviet requests to ally against the Germans and that overall, "it didn't make any sense." Since the film was made while the Soviets were allied to the Western Allies against the Germans, the film justifies the occupation by the Soviet need to obtain a buffer zone against a further Nazi advance to the east and implies that the Soviets entered Poland to stop Hitler. In doing so, the film repeats Soviet propaganda.

The film makes no mentions of the Soviet invasion of Poland and its battles at the Polish border forces or that the Soviets broke their own non-aggression pact with Poland. Soviet atrocities against Poland are omitted as well.

The film then notes that Hitler turns west to finish off Britain and France, which have declared war on Nazi Germany, rather than risk a two-front war, which leads to the third part of the installment dealing with the German invasion of Western Europe. The film concludes with the quote by Winston Churchill from his speech to the Allied delegates in 1941:

"What tragedies, what horrors, what crimes has Hitler and all that Hitler stands for brought upon Europe and the world! it is upon this foundation that Hitler [...] pretends to build out of hatred [....] a new order for Europe. But nothing is more certain than that every trace of Hitler's footsteps, every stain of his infected, and corroding fingers will be expunged, purged, and if need be, BLASTED from the surface of the earth. Lift up your hearts, all will come right. Out of depths of sorrow and sacrifice will be born again the glory of mankind."

Criticism
Polish-American historian Mieczysław B. Biskupski gave a harsh review, calling it "a conglomeration of patriotic exhortation, crackpot geopolitical theorizing, and historical mischief making." Noting that the film was more than inaccurate but an intentional attempt to falsify certain facts about the war, particularly by misportraying the Soviets, it casts the Poles in the role of failure and the Soviets in the role of guiltless saviors to serve a clear ideological role of justifying the Anglo-American alliance with the Soviet Union.

See also

 Propaganda in the United States  
 Sonderweg  
Western betrayal

References

External links 
 The Nazis Strike National Archives and Records Administration — via: YouTube 
 
 

1943 films
American black-and-white films
Films directed by Frank Capra
Films directed by Anatole Litvak
Why We Fight
Articles containing video clips
American war films
1940s war films
1943 documentary films
American documentary films
1940s American films